Prior Peak is located at the head of Waitabit Creek on the border of Alberta and British Columbia. It was named in 1924 after Edward Prior, Lieutenant-Governor of British Columbia from 1919-1920.

See also
 List of peaks on the British Columbia–Alberta border
 List of mountains in the Canadian Rockies

References

Three-thousanders of Alberta
Three-thousanders of British Columbia
Canadian Rockies
Mountains of Banff National Park